Jacques, Knight Moeschal (1913–2004) was a Belgian architect and sculptor.

1913 births
2004 deaths
20th-century Belgian architects
20th-century Belgian sculptors
People from Uccle